Canadian Review of Comparative Literature (French: Revue Canadienne de Littérature Comparée) is a quarterly peer-reviewed academic journal of comparative literature. It was established in 1974 by the Canadian Comparative Literature Association. The journal primarily publishes articles in English and French, but occasionally accepts articles in German, Russian and Italian. The editor-in-chief is Irene Sywenky (University of Alberta), the founding editor was M. V. Dimic' (1974-1998).

Abstracting and indexing
The journal is abstracted and indexed in the following bibliographic databases:

References

External links
 

Quarterly journals
English-language journals
Publications established in 1974
Literary magazines published in Canada